AS Saint-Luc is a football club in Kananga, Democratic Republic of Congo and currently playing in the Linafoot Ligue 2, the second level of the Congolese football.

Ground
They play their home games at 10,000 capacity Stade des Jeunes in Kananga.

Honours
Coupe du Congo
 Runner-up (1): 2000, 2004
Kasaï-Occidental Provincial League
Winners (3): 2000, 2001, 2002

Performance in CAF competitions
CAF Cup Winners' Cup: 1 appearance
2001 – Second Round

Kananga
Football clubs in the Democratic Republic of the Congo